Pieke ("Pie") Geelen (born 20 October 1972 in Nijmegen) is a former freestyle swimmer from the Netherlands, who competed for his native country at the 1996 Summer Olympics in Atlanta, Georgia. There he finished in fifth position with the Men's Relay Team in the 4x100m Freestyle, alongside Mark Veens, Martin van der Spoel, and Pieter van den Hoogenband.

References
 Dutch Olympic Committee

1972 births
Living people
Olympic swimmers of the Netherlands
Dutch male freestyle swimmers
Swimmers at the 1996 Summer Olympics
Sportspeople from Nijmegen
20th-century Dutch people